The Sinfonia Concertante for Violin, Viola, Cello and Orchestra in A major, K. Anh. 104 (320e), is an incomplete composition by Wolfgang Amadeus Mozart.

Background

Mozart is believed to have started work on this concerto around the same time as the Sinfonia Concertante in E-flat major K. 364. For unknown reasons Mozart abandoned the work after writing 134 bars of the opening movement.

Structure

As completed the work consists of a single movement, Allegro.

Completions

Several composers have completed the movement. Around 1870, Otto Bach composed a completion which Dennis Pajot described as having a very obvious join between the part written by Mozart and the part written by Bach. In 1969, Robert D. Levin wrote a completion that was more sympathetic to the surviving material. More recently, composer Hans Ueckert announced he was working on a completion for the Octava Chamber Orchestra. Another composer to have made a completion is Philip Wilby. Another completion was made by Italian composer Alessandro Solbiati for I Solisti Aquilani and played first time in Rotterdam during International Viola Congress 2018 (soloists: Daniele Orlando, violin – Gianluca Saggini, viola – Giulio Ferretti, cello).

References

Sources

External links
 

Concertos by Wolfgang Amadeus Mozart
Concertante symphonies
Concertos for multiple instruments
Compositions in A major
Unfinished concertos
Compositions by Wolfgang Amadeus Mozart published posthumously
Musical compositions completed by others